Archibald Clifford Graham (20 January 1917 – 10 June 2000) was a New Zealand cricketer. He played one first-class match for Otago in 1944/45.

Graham was born at Dunedin in 1917 and educated at Otago Boys' High School. He worked as a journalist. Following his death in 2000 an obituary was published in the New Zealand Cricket Annual. Graham's brother, Colin Graham, also played cricket for Otago.

References

1917 births
2000 deaths
New Zealand cricketers
Otago cricketers
Cricketers from Dunedin